Trisetomyia is a genus of flies belonging to the family Lesser Dung flies.

Species
T. triseta (Richards, 1954)

References

Sphaeroceridae
Diptera of Africa
Brachycera genera